David Junior Sackey (born September 6, 1993) is a professional Canadian football offensive lineman for the Edmonton Eskimos of the Canadian Football League (CFL). He won his first Grey Cup championship in 2017 with the Toronto Argonauts. He played CIS football for the Toronto Varsity Blues from 2012 to 2015.

High school

Sackey played high school football at St. Francis Xavier Secondary School where he was once named defensive lineman of the year and most improved player.

Professional career

Toronto Argonauts
Sackey was drafted by the Toronto Argonauts in the second round, 12th overall, in the 2016 CFL Draft and signed with the club on May 24, 2016. He played in six games in his rookie year in 2016 and dressed in his first CFL game on July 31, 2016 against the Ottawa Redblacks. In 2017, he spent the regular season and playoffs on the Argos practice roster. The Argos went on to win the 105th Grey Cup. On January 10, 2018, Sackey was re-signed by the Argos to a two-year contract. He dressed in a total of 13 games with the Argonauts and was released part way through the 2019 season on August 14, 2019.

Ottawa Redblacks
On August 20, 2019, it was announced that Sackey had agreed to a practice roster agreement with the Ottawa Redblacks.

References

External links
Ottawa Redblacks bio

1993 births
Living people
Canadian football offensive linemen
Ottawa Redblacks players
Players of Canadian football from Ontario
Canadian football people from Toronto
Toronto Argonauts players
Toronto Varsity Blues football players